The description Paris of the South has been applied to a number of locations, including:

Barcelona, Spain
Buenos Aires, Argentina
Canberra, Australia
Melbourne, Australia
New Orleans, Louisiana, United States
Nice, France
Rio de Janeiro, Brazil

See also
 Paris of the North
 Paris of the West
 Paris of the East
 Paris of the plains
 Paris of the Prairies
 Little Paris (disambiguation)

References

Lists of cities by nickname